Mensur Idrizi (born 3 August 1983) is a retired striker from North Macedonia.

Club career
Idrizi is of Albanian ethnicity. A journeyman midfielder, he has played in Macedonia, Albania and Kosovo.

Honours

Skënderbeu Korçë 
 Albanian Superliga (1): 2010–11

External links
 Macedonian Football 

1983 births
Living people
Sportspeople from Tetovo
Albanian footballers from North Macedonia
Association football wingers
Macedonian footballers
KF Shkëndija players
FK Rabotnički players
FK Vardar players
KF Elbasani players
KF Skënderbeu Korçë players
FK Teteks players
KS Pogradeci players
FK Drita players
FK Renova players
KF Ferizaj players
Macedonian First Football League players
Macedonian Second Football League players
Kategoria Superiore players
Football Superleague of Kosovo players
Macedonian expatriate footballers
Expatriate footballers in Albania
Macedonian expatriate sportspeople in Albania
Expatriate footballers in Kosovo
Macedonian expatriate sportspeople in Kosovo